Eszter Dudás (born 6 March 1992 in Budapest) is a Hungarian professional triathlete, European Junior Vice Champion of the year 2011, and, along with Eszter Pap and Zsófia Tóth, a member of the Heraklesz High Performance Team.

Eszter Dudás is number 6 in the Hungarian elite Ranglista, although she still belongs to the Junior category.
Since 2010, Dudás has taken part in elite ITU events as well, e.g. at the African Cup triathlon in Larache she placed 8th, and at the European Cup triathlons in Antalya and Cremona she placed 26th and 19th respectively.

In 2009, Eszter Dudás had her international breakthrough in the Junior category. She won the gold medals at the European Duathlon and the European Triathlon Team Championships, and in 2010 she won the Relay category with the European team at the Youth Olympic Games in Singapore.
In 2011 Dudás won the silver medal at the European Championships (Junior) and her team with Eszter Pap, David Pap and Gabor Hanko placed fourth.

In Hungary, Dudás represents Uniqa Újbuda Torna Club. Her coach is Csaba Kuttor.
Dudás attends the Veres Péter Gimnázium in Budapest.

ITU Competitions 
In the three years from 2008 to 2010 Eszter Dudás took part in 17 ITU competitions and achieved 10 top ten positions.
The following list is based upon the official ITU rankings and the ITU Athletes's Profile Page.
Unless indicated otherwise, the following events are triathlons (Olympic Distance) and refer to the Elite category.

External links 
 Hungarian Triathlon Federation in Hungarian

Notes 

1992 births
Living people
Sportspeople from Budapest
Hungarian female triathletes
Triathletes at the 2010 Summer Youth Olympics